This is a timeline documenting the events of heavy metal in the year 2014.

Bands formed 
Act of Defiance
Beyond the Black
 Black Pantera
Entombed A.D.
The Gentle Storm
The Mute Gods
Myrkur

Bands disbanded
 Bleeding Through
 Brutal Truth
 Chimaira
 Massacre
 Pestilence

Bands reformed
 Aftermath
 Atreyu (hiatus during 2011–2014)
 Breaking Benjamin (hiatus during 2010–2014)
 Centinex
 Haste the Day
 Life of Agony

Events
 On January 6, Benighted announced the departure of bassist Eric Lombard, and Alexis Lieu as his replacement.
 On January 10, bassist Dan Lilker (Nuclear Assault, Brutal Truth, ex-Anthrax) announced that he will be retiring from being a full-time musician on October 18, which will be his 50th birthday. He also announced that Brutal Truth will split up.
 On January 13, Testament announced the departure of bassist Greg Christian, and Steve DiGiorgio (who was part of the band from 1998 to 2004) as his replacement.
 On January 16, In Mourning announced that they have parted ways with drummer Christian Netzell. And on April 2, they introduced Mattias Bender as their new drummer.
 On January 26, Black Sabbath's "God Is Dead?" won this year's Grammy Award for Best Metal Performance. This was their first Grammy Award in 14 years, since their live version of "Iron Man" won the same category.
 On February 6, The Ronnie James Dio Stand Up and Shout Cancer Fund announced This is Your Life, a tribute album to celebrate the life and legacy of Ronnie James Dio. Covers of his songs from Rainbow, Black Sabbath and Dio will be performed by various artists: Metallica, Motörhead, Rob Halford (Judas Priest, Halford), Anthrax, Corey Taylor (Slipknot, Stone Sour), Halestorm, Killswitch Engage and many more.
 On February 12, Marky Edelmann (a.k.a. Marquis Marky) announced plans to leave Coroner at the end of February.
 On February 14, Lacuna Coil announced via their Facebook page that their guitarist Cristiano 'Pizza' Migliore and drummer Cristiano 'Criz' Mozzati have decided to retire from the band after 16 years citing personal reasons.
 On February 21, Per ‘Sodomizer’ Eriksson announced his departure from Katatonia and will be temporarily replaced by Bruce Soord (The Pineapple Thief, Wisdom of Crowds) and Tomas Åkvik (Nale) respectively.
 On February 24, Guitarist John Ricci announced his departure from Exciter due to his decision to retire from the music industry, and, on April 4, it was announced that bassist Rob "Clammy" Cohen will also part ways with the band due to both personal and business issues.
 On March 17, it was announced that Angela Gossow has left Arch Enemy but would remain as the band's manager. She is replaced by Alissa White-Gluz, former vocalist of The Agonist. On the same day, The Agonist have announced they have parted ways with Alissa and that Vicky Psarakis had taken over as their new vocalist.
 On March 31, Equilibrium announced that Andreas Völkl and Sandra Van Eldik, the founding members of their band, were leaving the band for unspecified reasons.
 On April 17, Daniel Liljekvist quit Katatonia, and was temporarily replaced by JP Asplund and Daniel Moilanen (ex-Engel) respectively.
 On April 25–26, Jag Panzer reunited for this year's edition of Keep It True Festival in Germany.
 On May 16, As I Lay Dying and Austrian Death Machine frontman Tim Lambesis was sentenced to six years in prison with a 48 days credit for custody already served for his role in a murder-for-hire plot to kill his wife.
 On June 8, Exodus announced the departure of their singer Rob Dukes. On the same day, they announced their reunion with Steve "Zetro" Souza, who was the singer of Exodus from 1986 to 1992, and again from 2002 to 2004.
 On July 10, Voivod announced the departure of bassist Jean-Yves "Blacky" Thériault for the second time.
 On August 19, Phil Anselmo announced that Superjoint Ritual would reunite for this year's Housecore Horror Film Festival under the name Superjoint.
 On November 17, Arch Enemy announced the departure of guitarist Nick Cordle and announced former Nevermore guitarist Jeff Loomis as his replacement.
 On November 25, drummer Shawn Drover announced his departure from Megadeth citing a desire to pursue his own musical interests.
 On November 26, guitarist Chris Broderick announced his departure from Megadeth due to musical differences.
 On November 26, drummer Kelly David-Smith announced his departure from Flotsam and Jetsam to focus on his family.
 On December 28, guitarist Herman Frank announced his second departure from Accept. Later that day, Accept announced that drummer Stefan Schwarzmann also left the band.
 In 2014, Mötley Crüe announced that they will embark on a farewell tour. However, according to singer Vince Neil, the band will not split up.
 In 2014, Vixen's surviving members resurrected the band in honor of the fallen Jan Kuehnemund, guitarist and founder of the band. They will perform at select festivals and showcase dates.

Deaths 

 March 23 – Dave Brockie (a.k.a. Oderus Urungus), vocalist of GWAR, died from accidental opioid overdose at the age of 50.
 March 24 – Paulo Schroeber, former guitarist of Almah, died from heart failure at the age of 40.
 April 5 – Jason McCash, former bassist of The Gates of Slumber, died from heroin overdose at the age of 37.
 April 15 – Shane Gibson, former touring guitarist of KoЯn, died from result of complications from a blood clotting disorder at the age of 35.
 May 11 - Ed Gagliardi, former bassist of Foreigner, died from cancer at the age of 62.
 May 12 – H. R. Giger, Swiss artist who provided artwork for numerous rock and metal bands such as KoЯn, Celtic Frost, Emerson, Lake & Palmer, Dead Kennedys, Danzig and Atrocity, died after being hospitalized for injuries sustained after he tripped and fell down stairs in his home at the age of 74.
 May 13 – Akihiro Yokoyama, bassist of United, died from undisclosed reasons at the age of 49.
 May 20 – Randy Coven, bassist for Ark, Steve Vai and Yngwie Malmsteen, died from arrest cardiac at the age of 55.
 June 1 – Victor Agnello, former drummer of Lȧȧz Rockit died of leukemia at the age of 50.
 June 4 – Doc Neeson, former vocalist and bassist of The Angels, died from a brain tumor at the age of 67.
 July 30 – Fausto Fanti (a.k.a. Blondie Hammett) former guitarist and humorist of Massacration, died from committing suicide due to depression at the age of 35.
 July 30 – Dick Wagner, former guitarist for Alice Cooper, died from respiratory failure at the age of 71.
 August 10 – Maria Kolokouri (a.k.a. Tristessa), vocalist of all-female band Astarte, died from complications from leukemia at the age of 37.
 August 27 – Tim Williams (a.k.a. Rawbiz), bassist of Suicidal Tendencies, died from seizure at the age of 31.
 October 25 – Jack Bruce, bassist of Cream, died from peacefully at home at the age of 71.
 November 1 – Wayne Static, vocalist and guitarist of Static-X, died from combined drug intoxication at the age of 48.
 November 9 – Jonathan Athon, bassist and vocalist of Black Tusk, died due to injuries sustained from a motorcycle accident at the age of 32.
 November 19 - Riff West, former bassist of Molly Hatchet, died from lengthy illness caused by severe injuries suffered in a car accident at the age of 64.

Albums released

January

February

March

April

May

June

July

August

September

October

November

December

References

External links
Top metal albums of 2014 at Rate Your Music

2010s in heavy metal music
Metal